Cloud One may refer to:

Cloud One (band), New York disco-soul studio band 1976-1978
Cloud One, project of Mick Moss 2010
Cloud One (album), Live Skull